Zion ( Ṣīyyōn, LXX , also variously transliterated Sion, Tzion, Tsion, Tsiyyon) is a placename in the Hebrew Bible used as a synonym for Jerusalem as well as for the Land of Israel as a whole.

The name is found in 2 Samuel (5:7), one of the books of the Hebrew Bible dated to before or close to the mid-6th century BCE. It originally referred to a specific hill in Jerusalem (Mount Zion), located to the south of Mount Moriah (the Temple Mount). According to the narrative of 2 Samuel 5, Mount Zion held the Jebusite fortress of the same name that was conquered by David and was renamed the City of David. 
That specific hill ("mount") is one of the many squat hills that form Jerusalem, which also includes Mount Moriah (the Temple Mount), the Mount of Olives, etc. Over many centuries, until as recently as the Ottoman era, the city walls of Jerusalem were rebuilt many times in new locations, so that the particular hill known as Mount Zion is no longer inside the city wall, but its location is now just outside the portion of the Old City wall forming the southern boundary of  the Jewish Quarter of the current Old City. Most of the original City of David itself is thus also outside the current city wall.

The term Tzion came to designate the area of Davidic Jerusalem where the fortress stood, and was used as well as synecdoche for the entire city of Jerusalem; and later, when Solomon's Temple was built on the adjacent Mount Moriah (which, as a result, came to be known as the Temple Mount) the meanings of the term Tzion were further extended by synecdoche to the additional meanings of the Temple itself, the hill upon which the Temple stood, the entire city of Jerusalem, the entire biblical Land of Israel, and "the World to Come", the Jewish understanding of the afterlife.

Etymology
The etymology of the word Zion (ṣiyôn) is uncertain.

Mentioned in the Old Testament in the Books of Samuel (2 Samuel 5:7) as the name of a Jebusite fortress conquered by David, its origin seems to predate the Israelites. If Semitic, it may be derived from the Hebrew root ṣiyyôn ("castle") or the Hebrew צִיָּה ṣiyya ("dry land" or "desert", Jeremiah 51:43). A non-Semitic relationship to the Hurrian word šeya ("river" or "brook") has also been suggested as also one of Hittite origin.

The form   (Tzion, Tiberian vocalization: Ṣiyyôn) appears 108 times in the Hebrew Bible, and once with article, as HaTzion.

Tsade is usually rendered as z in English Bible translations, hence the spelling Zion (rather than Tzion).
This convention apparently originates in German orthography, where z stands for the consonant [t͡s].

Hebrew Bible

Zion is mentioned 152 times in the Hebrew Bible (Tanakh), most often in the Prophetic books, the Book of Psalms, and the Book of Lamentations, besides  six mentions in the Historical books (Kings, Samuel, Chronicles)
and a single mention of the "daughters of Zion" in the Song of Songs (3:11)

Out of the 152 mentions, 26 instances are within the phrase of "Daughter of Zion" (Hebrew "bat Tzion").
This is a personification of the city of Jerusalem, or of its population.

In Psalm 137, Zion (Jerusalem) is remembered from the perspective of the Babylonian Captivity. 
"[1] By the rivers of Babylon, there we sat down, yea, we wept, when we remembered Zion. [2] We hanged our harps upon the willows in the midst thereof. [3] For there they that carried us away captive required of us a song; and they that wasted us required of us mirth, saying, Sing us one of the songs of Zion." In verse 8, the phrase "Daughter of Babylon"
appears as a personification of Babylon or its population: "[8] O daughter of Babylon, who art to be destroyed; happy shall he be, that rewardeth thee as thou hast served us."

Psalm 147 uses "Jerusalem"  and "Zion" interchangeably to address the faithful: "[2] The Lord doth build up Jerusalem: he gathereth together the outcast of Israel. [...] [12] Praise the Lord, O Jerusalem; praise thy God, O Zion."

Judaism
The location of the Temple, and in particular its Holy of Holies (innermost sanctum), is the most holy place in the world for the Jewish people, seen as the connection between God and humanity. Observant Jews recite the Amidah three times a day facing the Temple Mount in Jerusalem, praying for the rebuilding of the Holy Temple, the restoration of the Temple service, the redemption of the world, and for the coming of the Messiah.

In Kabbalah, the more esoteric reference is made to Tzion being the spiritual point from which reality emerges, located in the Holy of Holies of the First, Second and Third Temple.

Zionism

The term "Zionism", coined by Austrian Nathan Birnbaum, was derived from the German rendering of Tzion in his journal Selbstemanzipation ("self emancipation") in 1890. Zionism as a modern political movement started in 1897 and supported a "national home", and later a state, for the Jewish people in the Land of Israel, though the idea has been around since the end of Jewish independent rule. The Zionist movement declared the establishment of the State of Israel in 1948, following the United Nations Partition Plan for Palestine. Since then, and with varying ideologies, Zionists have focused on developing and protecting this state.

The last line of the Israeli national anthem Hatikvah (Hebrew for "The Hope") is "....Eretz Zion, ViYerushalayim", which means literally "The land of Zion and Jerusalem".

Islamic tradition
Ṣahyūn (Ṣahyūn or Ṣihyūn) is the word for Zion in Arabic and Syriac. Drawing on biblical tradition, it is one of the names accorded to Jerusalem in Arabic and Islamic tradition. A valley called Wādī Sahyũn seemingly preserves the name and is located approximately one and three-quarter miles from the Old City's Jaffa Gate.

For example, the reference to the "precious cornerstone" of the new Jerusalem in the Book of Isaiah 28:16 is identified in Islamic scholarship as the Black Stone of the Kaaba. This interpretation is said by ibn Qayyim al-Jawziyya (1292–1350) to have come from the People of the Book, though earlier Christian scholarship identifies the cornerstone with Jesus.

Latter Day Saint

Within the Latter Day Saint movement, Zion is often used to connote a peaceful ideal society. In the Latter Day Saints belief system the term Zion is often used to denote a place of gathering for the saints. It is also often used to denote an area or city of refuge for the saints.

Rastafari movement

In Rastafari, "Zion" stands for a utopian place of unity, peace and freedom, as opposed to "Babylon", the oppressing and exploiting system of the materialistic modern world and a place of evil.

It proclaims Zion, as reference to Ethiopia, the original birthplace of humankind, and from the beginning of the movement calls to repatriation to Zion, the Promised Land and Heaven on Earth. Some Rastafari believe themselves to represent the real Children of Israel in modern times, and their goal is to repatriate to Ethiopia, or to Zion. The Ge'ez-language Kebra Nagast serves as inspiration for the idea that the "Glory of Zion" transferred from Jerusalem to Ethiopia in the time of Solomon and Sheba, c. 950 BCE.

Rastafari reggae contains many references to Zion; among the best-known examples are the Bob Marley songs "Zion Train", "Iron Lion Zion", the Bunny Wailer song "Rastaman" ("The Rasta come from Zion, Rastaman a Lion!"), The Melodians song "Rivers of Babylon" (based on Psalm 137, where the captivity of Babylon is contrasted with the freedom in Zion), the Bad Brains song "Leaving Babylon", the Damian Marley song featuring Nas "Road to Zion", The Abyssinians' "Forward Unto Zion" and Kiddus I's "Graduation in Zion", which is featured in the 1977 cult roots rock reggae film Rockers, and "Let's Go to Zion" by Winston Francis. Reggae groups such as Steel Pulse and Cocoa Tea also have many references to Zion in their various songs.

The Jewish longing for Zion, starting with the deportation and enslavement of Jews during the Babylonian captivity, was adopted as a metaphor by Christian black slaves in the United States.
Thus, Zion symbolizes a longing by wandering peoples for a safe homeland. This could be an actual place such as Ethiopia for Rastafari or Israel for the Jews.
Rastafari, while not identifying as "Jews", identify themselves and Africa as Zion. Specifically, Ethiopia is acknowledged as the mountains of Zion. Further, Rastafari ontology views all Africans as God's Chosen People. This differs from Judaic narratives.

The Bahá’í Faith 

References to Zion occur in the writings of the Bahá’í Faith. Bahá’u’lláh, the prophet-founder of the Bahá’í Faith wrote, concerning the Bahá’í Revelation,"The time foreordained unto the peoples and kindreds of the earth is now come. The promises of God, as recorded in the holy Scriptures, have all been fulfilled. Out of Zion hath gone forth the Law of God, and Jerusalem, and the hills and land thereof, are filled with the glory of His Revelation."  -Bahá’u’lláh, Gleanings from the Writings of Bahá’u’lláh"Call out to Zion, O Carmel, and announce the joyful tidings: He that was hidden from mortal eyes is come! His all-conquering sovereignty is manifest; His all-encompassing splendor is revealed." 

-Bahá’u’lláh, Tablet of Carmel, Tablets of Baháʼu'lláh Revealed After the Kitáb-i-Aqdas

Mount Zion today

Today, Mount Zion refers to a hill south of the Old City's Armenian Quarter, not to the Temple Mount. This apparent misidentification dates at least from the 1st century AD, when Josephus calls Jerusalem's Western Hill "Mount Zion". The Abbey of the Dormition and King David's Tomb are located upon the hill currently called Mount Zion.

See also
 Beulah (land)
 Book of Micah
 Jerusalem of Gold
 Names of Jerusalem
 New Jerusalem
 New world order (Baháʼí)

References

Bibliography
 
 Ludlow, D. H. (Ed.) (1992). Vol 4. Encyclopedia of Mormonism. New York: Macmillan Publishing Company.
 McConkie, B. R. (1966). Mormon Doctrine. (2nd ed). Utah: Bookcraft.
 Steven Zarlengo: Daughter of Zion: Jerusalem's Past, Present, and Future. Dallas: Joseph Publishing, 2007.

Further reading
 Batto, Bernard F.; Roberts, Kathryn L. (2004). David and Zion: Biblical Studies in Honor of J. J. M. Roberts. Winona Lake, Ill.: Eisenbrauns. .
 Shatz, Adam, "We Are Conquerors" (review of Tom Segev, A State at Any Cost: The Life of David Ben-Gurion, Head of Zeus, 2019, 804 pp.), London Review of Books, vol. 41, no. 20 (24 October 2019), pp. 37–38, 40–42. "Segev's biography... shows how central exclusionary nationalism, war and racism were to Ben-Gurion's vision of the Jewish homeland in Palestine, and how contemptuous he was not only of the Arabs but of Jewish life outside Zion. [Liberal Jews] may look at the state that Ben-Gurion built, and ask if the cost has been worth it." (p. 42 of Shatz's review.)

Geography of Jerusalem
History of Jerusalem
Rastafari
Zionism
Mythical utopias